Ninia sebae, commonly known as the redback coffee snake or the red coffee snake, is a species of small terrestrial snake in the family Colubridae. The species is endemic to Mexico and Central America south to Costa Rica.  Although it resembles some venomous coral snakes in color and size, it is not venomous and seldom bites humans.

Etymology
The specific name, sebae, is in honor of Dutch naturalist Albertus Seba.

Subspecies
Four subspecies are recognized as being valid, including the nominotypical subspecies.
Ninia sebae immaculata 
Ninia sebae morleyi 
Ninia sebae punctulata 
Ninia sebae sebae 

Nota bene: A trinomial authority in parentheses indicates that the subspecies was originally described in a genus other than Ninia.

Habitat

Behavior
Coffee snakes (species in the genus Ninia) are thought to rely on concealment, flight and intimidation to avoid predation. These snakes were observed either flattening their entire bodies when alarmed, or remaining motionless in whatever position they were discovered. In a more recent study these snakes, when touched, displayed a flattened head and neck, and raised their anterior third or half.

Diet
N. sebae preys upon earthworms.

Reproduction
N. sebae is oviparous.

References

Further reading
Bocourt MF (1883). "Études sur les reptiles ". pp. i–xiv, 1–1012. In: Duméril A[HA], Bocourt MF, Mocquard F (1870–1909). Recherches Zoologiques pour servir a l'Histoire de la Faune de l'Amérique Centrale et du Mexique. Paris: Mission Scientifique au Mexique et dans l'Amérique. (Impremerie Impériale, printer). (Streptophorus sebae var. punctulata, new variety, pp. 547–548). (in French).
Duméril A-M-C, Bibron G, Duméril A[-H-A] (1854). Erpétologie générale ou histoire naturelle complète des reptiles. Tome septième. Première partie. Comprenant l'histoire des serpents non venimeux [= General Herpetology or Complete Natural History of the Reptiles. Volume 7. Part 1. Containing the Natural History of the Nonvenomous Snakes]. Paris: Roret. xvi + 780 pp. (Streptophorus sebae, new species, pp. 115–117). (in French).
Heimes, Peter (2016). Snakes of Mexico: Herpetofauna Mexicana Vol. I. Frankfurt am Main, Germany: Chimaira. 572 pp. .
Schmidt KP, Andrews EW (1936). "Notes on Snakes from Yucatan". Zoological Series of Field Museum of Natural History 20 (18): 167–187. (Ninia sebae morleyi, new subspecies, pp. 169–171).
Schmidt KP, Rand AS (1957). "Geographic Variation in the Central American Colubrine Snake, Ninia sebae". Fieldiana · Zoology 39 (10): 73—84. (Ninia sebae immaculata, new subspecies, pp. 81–82).

Ninia
Snakes of Central America
Reptiles of Belize
Reptiles of Costa Rica
Reptiles of Guatemala
Reptiles of Honduras
Reptiles of Mexico
Reptiles of Nicaragua
Reptiles described in 1854
Taxa named by Gabriel Bibron
Taxa named by André Marie Constant Duméril
Taxa named by Auguste Duméril